Carole Mowlam (1936–2012) was a British stage and film actress.

She appeared in a recurring role in the early British soap opera The Grove Family. In 1961 she starred in the BBC's The House Under the Water, based on the novel by Francis Brett Young.

She appeared alongside Ian Hendry in the 1977 television play The Goldfinch as part of The Sunday Drama series.

Selected filmography
 The Grove Family (1956–1957, 29 episodes)
 Probation Officer (1960, 1 episode)
 The House Under the Water (1961, 8 episodes)
 Z Cars (1963, 1 episode)
 The Likely Lads (1964, 1 episode)
 Our Man at St. Mark's (1964, 1 episode)
 Melissa (1964, 2 episodes)
 Adam Adamant Lives! (1966, 1 episode)
 Spindoe (1968, 2 episodes)
 Harriet's Back in Town (1972, 16 episodes)
 The Brothers (1975–1976, 26 episodes)
 Coronation Street (1977, 4 episodes)
 Summer's Lease (1989, 1 episode)

References

Bibliography 
 Ellen Baskin. Serials on British Television, 1950–1994. Scolar Press, 1996.
 Gabriel Hershman. Send in the Clowns – The Yo Yo Life of Ian Hendry. 2013.
 Su Holmes. Entertaining television: The BBC and popular television culture in the 1950s. Manchester University Press, 2015.

External links 
 

1936 births
2012 deaths
British soap opera actresses
British stage actresses
People from Epsom
20th-century British businesspeople